Sir Walter de Haliburton, 1st Lord Haliburton of Dirleton (died circa 1449), Lord High Treasurer of Scotland was a Scottish noble.

Life
The eldest son of Sir John Haliburton of Dirleton (d. 1392), by his spouse Margaret, daughter of Sir John Cameron of Ballegarno. He succeeded to the Dirleton estate in East Lothian, upon the death of his father in 1392 and also inherited his uncle's estate of Haliburton in the early 15th century. Sir Walter was one of the hostages for King James I on 28 March 1424 and was exchanged and permitted to return to Scotland on 16 July 1425. He is named as one of the Scottish Commissioners to meet the English at Hawdenstank with 800 men to redress complaints, in a Safe-Conduct dated 24 January 1430 (1429/30).

In 1439 and 1440 he was appointed Lord High Treasurer of Scotland, and in the latter year was created a Lord of Parliament. He remained Lord High Treasurer until 1449, a post which he could not hold unless he was also a Privy Councillor.

Marriage and issue
He married Lady Isobel, daughter of the Regent, Robert Stewart, Duke of Albany and Margaret Graham, Countess of Menteith, widow of Alexander Leslie, Earl of Ross (d. 1402), and they had four sons and one daughter:

John Haliburton, 2nd Lord Haliburton of Dirleton
Walter Haliburton of Pitcuor, who married Catherine who is daughter & co-heiress of Alexander de Chisholm.
Robert Haliburton
William Haliburton
Jean Haliburton, married to Henry I Sinclair, Earl of Orkney

He is also said to be the second husband of Marjorie Douglas, daughter of Archibald Douglas, 3rd Earl of Douglas and Joanna Moray.

Citations

References
Mackenzie, Agnes Mure, MA, D.Litt., The Rise of the Stewarts, London, 1935, p. 108.
Rogers, Charles,LL.D., Genealogical Memoirs of the family of Sir Walter Scott, Bt., with his Memorials of the Halibirtons, London, 1877, p.xxx.

Haliburton, Walter, 1st Lord
Walter
Haliburton, Walter, 1st Lord
Haliburton, Walter, 1st Lord
Haliburton, Walter, 1st Lord
15th-century Scottish people
Year of birth unknown
1440s deaths
Peers created by James II of Scotland